Ba. is a Lithuanian rock band. It was formed in Vilnius, Lithuania.

History

Early years 
ba. (initials of Benas Aleksandravičius) began as a solo music project. From childhood Aleksandravičius enjoyed creating sounds and playing electric guitar. He made his first breakthrough at 17 with the song "Tai ne žmogus" (English: "It's not human") in 2013. His music video gained attention and popularity on YouTube.

Later, Benas collaborated with Jonas Butvydas (drums). they played many concerts and festivals. In 2013, ba. released its first EP album Raktas ("key"). The album had five tracks. The following year, EP Namai ("home") came out with 3 tracks.

After touring, ba. released a full-length album Rasti/Pasiklysti in 2015. Its most popular songs were "Tai ne žmogus", "Sugebet pasikeist", "Naktį judu" and "Į mane", garnering views on YouTube and recognition on radio and television.

ba. strengthened the group's structure by adding Maratas, on bass guitar. The band released another EP, SAULĖSUŽTĖMIMAS" in 2016 and EP Garsiai Mastau in early 2017.

The same year, filmmaker group "TWODICKSKLAN" made a visual trilogy, Kūną palikai/Atsibudai.

Band renovation 
In 2017, Maratas and Butvydas left the band, replaced by Simonas Motiejūnas (guitar), who had played with ba. occasionally in early years, Nikita Voitovas (bass guitar) and Dominykas Babikas (drums). They continued to perform.

ba. 5 years anniversary 

In 2018, ba. published a book Chaosas manyje nieko naujo (Chaos inside me is nothing new), which consisted of photos from backstage at performances and a CD with their most popular songs. The band released a documentary film about the group's wild musical life.

Discography

External links 

 
 

Lithuanian rock musicians